Lansford Warren Hastings (1819–1870) was an American explorer and Confederate soldier. He is best remembered as the developer of Hastings Cutoff, a claimed shortcut to California across what is now the state of Utah, a factor in the Donner Party disaster of 1846. He was a Major in the Confederate States Army during the American Civil War.

Early life
Born to Dr. Waitstill and Lucinda (Wood) Hastings in Mount Vernon, Ohio, he was a descendant of Thomas Hastings who came from East Anglia in England to the Massachusetts Bay Colony in 1634. Hastings was trained as a lawyer. In 1842, he traveled overland to Oregon. While there, he briefly represented Dr. John McLoughlin, preparing his land claim near Willamette Falls and surveying Oregon City, Oregon (which would become the first incorporated city west of the Rocky Mountains). He left in the spring of 1843 for Alta California, a sparsely populated province of Mexico. By the time he returned to the United States in 1844, he had decided to help to wrest California from Mexico and establish an independent Republic of California, with himself holding high office.

The Republic of California

Hastings wrote The Emigrants' Guide to Oregon and California to induce Americans to move to California, hoping they could effect a bloodless revolution by sheer numbers. He described California in glowing terms and gave practical advice to overland travelers. In his book he wrote: "The most direct path would be leave the Oregon route, about two hundred miles east of Fort Hall; thence bearing west-south west, to the Salt Lake; and thence continuing down to the bay of San Francisco." (Hastings, pp. 137–138).  Hastings wrote this statement before he had traveled the route himself, and he was unaware of the difficulties in crossing the Wasatch Range and the salt flats of western Utah. His first attempt was only from Salt Lake City to Fort Bridger, which he did in mild weather, without time constraints, and without ever attempting to cross the desert portion. Afterward, he eagerly spread the word that his overland route was faster and better than any other. According to historian Thomas F. Andrews, "It was Hastings’s renown as an author and trail leader, coupled with his presence on the trail…that helped persuade the [Donner] emigrants to undertake the cutoff that now bears his name."
Hastings's dream of empire soon collapsed when California was conquered by the United States military during the Mexican–American War. In 1848, Mexico ceded California to the United States under the Treaty of Guadalupe Hidalgo.

A home of his in California, the Hastings Adobe, is listed on the National Register of Historic Places.

Later years

After serving as a captain in the California Battalion during the Mexican War, Hastings again took up the practice of law. He married Charlotte Toler in 1848 and was a delegate to the 1849 California Constitutional Convention. In the late 1850s he moved his family to Yuma, Arizona, where he served as postmaster and as a territorial judge. During the Civil War, Hastings sided with the South. In 1864, he travelled to Richmond, Virginia, where he met with Confederate President Jefferson Davis to gain his support for a plan to separate California from the Union and unite it with the Confederacy. Upon meeting him, President Davis promoted Hastings to the rank of Major in the Confederate States Army, and asked him to assemble a military unit in Arizona, with the aim of defending California. However, the so-called Hastings Plot came to little, as the war ended early the following year.

After the end of the war, many disgruntled former Confederates left the United States to establish colonies in Brazil. Hastings visited the region, made arrangements with the Brazilian government, and wrote The Emigrant's Guide to Brazil (1867) to attract potential colonists. He died at St. Thomas in the Virgin Islands in 1870, possibly of yellow fever, while conducting a shipload of settlers to his colony at Santarém.

References

 Hastings, Lansford W. The Emigrants' Guide to Oregon and California. Bedford, Mass.: Applewood Books, 1994. (Facsimile of the 1845 ed.)
 Bagley, Will. "Lansford Warren Hastings: Scoundrel or Visionary?" Overland Journal 12:1 (Spring 1994): 12-26.
 Cumming, John. "Lansford Hastings' Michigan Connection." Overland Journal 16:3 (Fall 1998): 17-28.
 Andrews, Thomas Franklin. The Controversial Career of Lansford W. Hastings: Pioneer California Promoter and Emigrant Guide. Ph.D. dissertation, University of Southern California, 1970.
 Dawsey, Cyrus B. and James M. Dawsey, eds. The Confederados: Old South Emigrants in Brazil. Tuscaloosa: University of Alabama, 1995.

External links
 Roy Tea's Hastings Cutoff Page
 Hastings Cutoff Trail Guides by Roy D. Tea
 
 The Emigrants' Guide to Oregon and California from American Studies at the University of Virginia.
 Descendants of Thomas Hastings website
 Descendants of Thomas Hastings on Facebook
 "Hastings Country" website
 The Emigrants' Guide to Oregon and California by Lansford Hastings, digitized book

1819 births
1870 deaths
People from Mount Vernon, Ohio
Writers from Ohio
Donner Party
American explorers
People of the American Old West
Confederate States Army officers